Marie-Cécile Gros-Gaudenier (born 18 June 1960 in Scionzier, France) is a retired French alpine skier.

External links
 

1960 births
Living people
French female alpine skiers
FIS Alpine Ski World Cup champions
Sportspeople from Haute-Savoie
20th-century French women